Eloise Tungpalan (born July 1, 1945) is an American politician who served in the Hawaii House of Representatives from 1981 to 1987 and in the Hawaii Senate from 1987 to 1995.

References

1945 births
Living people
Women state legislators in Hawaii
Democratic Party members of the Hawaii House of Representatives
Democratic Party Hawaii state senators
21st-century American women